The O 9-class submarine consisted of three submarines, built for the Royal Netherlands Navy. Used for patrols in the Dutch home waters. The class comprised O 9, O 10, and O 11.

Design
The O 9-class submarines were designed by J.J. van der Struyff, at the time chief engineer of the Royal Netherlands Navy (RNN). Together with the submarines of the K XI class they were the first submarines designed fully in-house by the RNN, which resulted in the first indigenous Dutch submarine design. The submarines of the O 9-class were the first Dutch submarines built with two propellers and a double hull. Previous classes only had a single hull and one propeller. As a result the submarines of the O 9-class had a different external shape in comparison to previous Dutch submarine classes as they were no longer cigar shaped. The submarines had a length of 54.66 meters, a beam of 5.70 meters and a draught of 3.53 meters. Furthermore, each submarine had a displacement of 526 ton while surfaced and 656 ton underwater. The diving depth of the O 9 class was 60 meters.

The primary armament of the O 9-class submarines consisted of five torpedo tubes; two 53.3 cm torpedo tubes and three 45 cm torpedo tubes. The 45 cm torpedo tubes were unusual since most contemporary submarines in service with foreign navies at the time did not use 45 cm torpedo tubes anymore. In addition to the torpedo tubes, each submarine had a single 8.8 cm cannon and a machine gun, which could be used against planes. There was also enough room in the submarine to store 10 torpedoes.

The O 9-class submarines were equipped with two 6 cylinder two-stroke diesel engines made by the company Sulzer in Winterthur. Besides the diesel engines, it also had two electric motors and 120 cells. This gave a capacity of 4350 Ah and allowed the submarine to operate solely on electric power for 3 hours. The engines allowed the submarines to reach 900 hp when surfaced and 500 hp underwater, which resulted in a maximum speed while surfaced of 12 kn and underwater 8 knots.

Service history
In the morning of 6 March 1940 the submarines of the O 9-class were planning to do exercises near Texel that would be filmed for propaganda purposes. However, while leaving the harbor of Den Helder the O 11 got rammed by the surveillance vessel BV 3 and as a result of severe damage sunk.

At the time of the German invasion O 11 was under repair in Den Helder. On 14 May 1940 she was scuttled there to prevent her being captured by German forces. However the Germans raised the ship and ordered it repaired. In September 1944 O 11 was sunk in Den Helder to block the entrance of the harbour.

Ships in class
The ships were built by three different shipyards. O 9 was built by the Koninklijke Maatschappij De Schelde in Flushing, O 10 in Amsterdam at the Nederlandsche Scheepsbouw Maatschappij and O 11  in Rotterdam at Fijenoord shipyard.

Citations

References

Further reading

External links
Description of class